Cerová is a village and municipality in the Senica District of Slovakia.

Cerova may also refer to:

Bosnia and Herzegovina
Cerova, Kalinovik, a village in the municipality of Kalinovik, Republika Srpska
Cerova Ravan, a village in the municipality of Foča, Republika Srpska

Serbia
Cerova (Arilje), a village the Moravica District
Cerova (Krupanj), a village in the Mačva District
Cerova (Kruševac), a village in Rasina District
Cerova (Pirot), a village
Cerova, Gornji Milanovac, a village the Moravica District

See also
Cerovac (disambiguation)
Cerovo (disambiguation)

Serbo-Croatian place names